The Owen County Courthouse is a historic courthouse located at Spencer, Owen County, Indiana, United States.  It was the work of Jesse Johnson and Christian Kanzler & Son and built in 1910–1911.  It is a three-story, with basement, Classical Revival style limestone building. The flat roof is topped by a copper dome with four-sided Seth Thomas clock.

It was listed on the National Register of Historic Places in 1994.

References

External links

Clock towers in Indiana
County courthouses in Indiana
Courthouses on the National Register of Historic Places in Indiana
Neoclassical architecture in Indiana
Government buildings completed in 1911
1911 establishments in Indiana
Buildings and structures in Owen County, Indiana
National Register of Historic Places in Owen County, Indiana